Amélie Sarn-Cantin (born 4 March 1970) is a French author, comic book writer and translator. In 2006, she took over Geneviève Huriet's role as the author of the Beechwood Bunny Tales series, with Qu'as-tu fait, Mistouflet ? and L'album photo des Passiflore.

In April 2002, Sarn published her first novel for adults, Elle ne pleure pas, elle chante. She has written numerous books for youth.  (https://www.leslibraires.ca/ecrit-par/?ia=3087432) She later wrote the book adaptation of Sylvain Chomet's The Triplets of Belleville.

Sarn's works have been published in France by Éditions Milan, Rageot, Albin-Michel and Groupe Flammarion.

References

Sources
 Biography of Amélie Sarn at Bedetheque. Retrieved 22 March 2008.

1970 births
Living people
French children's writers
French women children's writers
French comics writers
21st-century French novelists
21st-century French women